Schmerlenbach may refer to:

 Schmerlenbach (Nonnenbach), a river of Bavaria, Germany
 Schmerlenbach (Teufelsbach), a river of Saxony-Anhalt, Germany